Used Songs 1973–1980 is a compilation of songs from Tom Waits's Asylum Records years.

Track listing
Songs written by Tom Waits

 "Heartattack and Vine" - 4:44
from Heartattack and Vine (1980)
Tom Waits - vocals, electric guitar
Larry Taylor - bass
John Thomassie - drums
Plas Johnson - tenor and baritone saxes
 "Eggs and Sausage (In a Cadillac With Susan Michelson)" - 4:23
from Nighthawks at the Diner (1975)
Tom Waits - vocals, piano
Mike Melvoin - electric piano
Jim Hughart - bass
Bill Goodwin - drums
Pete Christlieb - tenor sax
 "A Sight for Sore Eyes" - 4:41
from Foreign Affairs (1977)
Tom Waits - vocals, piano
Jim Hughart - bass
 "Whistlin' Past the Graveyard" - 3:16
from Blue Valentine (1978)
Tom Waits - vocals, electric guitar
Alvin "Shine" Robinson - electric guitar
Harold Battiste - piano
Scott Edwards - bass
Earl Palmer - drums
Herbert Hardesty - tenor sax
 "Burma Shave" - 6:33
from Foreign Affairs (1977)
Tom Waits - vocals, piano
Jim Hughart - bass
Jack Sheldon - trumpet
 "Step Right Up" - 5:40
from Small Change (1976)
Tom Waits - vocals
Jim Hughart - bass
Shelly Manne - drums
Lew Tabackin - tenor sax
 "Ol' '55" - 3:58
from Closing Time (1973)
Tom Waits - vocals, piano
Peter Klimes - guitar
Bill Plummer - bass
John Seiter - drums, vocals
 "I Never Talk to Strangers (with Bette Midler)" - 3:38
from Foreign Affairs (1977)
Tom Waits - vocals, piano
Bette Midler - vocals
Jim Hughart - bass
Frank Vicari - tenor sax
Bob Alcivar - arranger, conductor
 "Mr. Siegal" - 5:14
from Heartattack and Vine (1980)
Tom Waits - vocals, electric guitar
Roland Bautista - electric lead guitar
Ronny Barron - piano
Larry Taylor - bass
John Thomassie - drums
 "Jersey Girl" - 5:10
from Heartattack and Vine (1980)
Tom Waits - vocals, electric guitar
Roland Bautista - 12-string guitar
Victor Feldman - keyboard glock, percussion
Greg Cohen - bass
John Thomassie - drums
Jerry Yester - arranger, conductor
 "Christmas Card from a Hooker in Minneapolis" - 4:32
from Blue Valentine (1978)
Tom Waits - vocals, piano
DaWillie Gonga - Yamaha electric grand piano
 "Blue Valentine" - 5:51
from Blue Valentine (1978)
Tom Waits - vocals, electric guitar
Ray Crawford - electric guitar solo
 "(Looking for) The Heart of Saturday Night" - 3:51
 from The Heart of Saturday Night (1974)
Tom Waits - vocals, acoustic guitar
Jim Hughart - bass
Jim Gordon - foot tap, knee slap
Selma & Cahuenga - streets
 "Muriel" - 3:34
from Foreign Affairs (1977)
Tom Waits - vocals, piano
Jim Hughart - bass
Frank Vicari - tenor sax
 "Wrong Side of the Road" - 5:14
from Blue Valentine (1978)
Tom Waits - vocals, electric guitar
Ray Crawford - electric guitar
Charles Kynard - organ
Jim Hughart - bass
Chip White - drums
Frank Vicari - tenor sax 
 "Tom Traubert's Blues (Four Sheets to the Wind in Copenhagen)" - 6:35
from Small Change (1976)
Tom Waits - vocals, piano
Jim Hughart - bass
Violins - Murray Adler, Israel Baker, Harry Bluestone, Nathan Kaproff, George Kast, Marvin Limonick, Alfred Lustgarden, Nathan Ross, Sheldon Sanov
Violas - Sam Boghossian, Allan Harshman, David Schwartz
Cellos - Jesse Ehrlich, Ray Kelley, Ed Lustgarden, Kathleen Lustgarden
Jerry Yester - arranger, conductor

Personnel
 Vocals - Tom Waits, Bette Midler, John Seiter
 Acoustic Guitar - Tom Waits, Roland Bautista, Peter Klimes
 Electric Guitar - Tom Waits, Ray Crawford, Roland Bautista, Alvin "Shine" Robinson
 Bass - Jim Hughart, Larry Taylor, Greg Cohen, Scott Edwards, Bill Plummer
 Piano - Tom Waits, Ronnie Barron, Harold Battiste
 Electric Piano - DaWillie Gonga, Mike Melvoin
 Organ - Charles Kynard
 Drums - John Thomassie, Bill Goodwin, Shelly Manne, Earl Palmer, John Seiter, Chip White
 Percussion - Victor Feldman, Jim Gordon
 Arranger - Jerry Yester, Bob Alcivar
 Conductor - Jerry Yester, Bob Alcivar
 Violin - Murray Adler, Israel Baker, Harry Bluestone, Nathan Kaproff, George Kast, Marvin Limonick, Alfred Lustgarden, Nathan Ross, Sheldon Sanov
 Viola - Sam Boghossian, Allan Harshman, David Schwartz
 Cello - Jesse Ehrlich, Ray Kelley, Ed Lustgarden, Kathleen Lustgarden
 Trumpet - Jack Sheldon
 Tenor Saxophone - Frank Vicari, Pete Christlieb, Herbert Hardesty, Plas Johnson, Lew Tabackin
 Baritone Saxophone - Plas Johnson

Charts

Certifications

References

2001 compilation albums
Tom Waits compilation albums
Rhino Records compilation albums